Sarapdoh is a village in the Karmala taluka of Solapur district in Maharashtra state, India.

Demographics
Covering  and comprising 200 households at the time of the 2011 census of India, Sarapdoh had a population of 894. There were 478 males and 416 females, with 92 people being aged six or younger.

References

Villages in Karmala taluka